James Phelan may refer to:
 James Phelan (American football) (1892–1974), American football player and coach
 James Phelan (literary scholar) (born 1951), American literary critic
 James Phelan Jr. (1856–1891), American politician, son of James Phelan, Sr.
 James Phelan Sr. (1821–1873), Confederate States of America politician
 James Clancy Phelan (born 1979), Australian thriller writer
 James D. Phelan (1861–1930), American politician; Mayor of San Francisco and U.S. Senator from California
 Jim Phelan (basketball) (1929–2021), American college basketball coach
 Jim Phelan (Irish writer) (1899–1966), Irish tramp who wrote on tramp and prison life
 Jimmy Phelan (hurler) (1917–2006), Irish hurler
 James Phelan (1912-1997), American investigative reporter

See also
 , a World War II Liberty ship